The 2016–17 Portland Pilots men's basketball team represented the University of Portland during the 2016–17 NCAA Division I men's basketball season. The Pilots, led by first-year head coach Terry Porter, played their home games at the Chiles Center as members of the West Coast Conference. They finished the season 11–22, 2–16 in WCC play to finish in last place. They defeated San Diego in the first round of the WCC tournament to advance to the quarterfinals where they lost to Saint Mary's.

Previous season 
The Pilots finished the 2015–16 season 12–20, 6–12 in WCC play to finish in a three-way tie for seventh place. They lost in the quarterfinals of the WCC tournament to Gonzaga.

On March 15, 2016, the school fired head coach Eric Reveno. He finished at Portland with a 10-year record of 140–178. On April 1, the school announced that Terry Porter had been hired as head coach.

Departures

Incoming Transfers

Recruitment

Recruiting class of 2017

Roster

Schedule and results

|-
!colspan=9 style=| Exhibition

|-
!colspan=9 style=| Regular season

|-
!colspan=9 style=| WCC tournament

Source: Schedule

References

Portland
Portland Pilots men's basketball seasons
Portland Pilots men's basketball
Portland Pilots men's basketball
Port
Port